Allmannberget is a mountain in the municipality of Oppdal in Trøndelag county, Norway.

The easiest hiking route is from the east-north-east. There is a communication tower on the top of the mountain.

Name
The first element is allmann which means "common/public property" (literally "for all men"), and the last element is the finite form of berg which means "rocky mountain".

References

Mountains of Trøndelag
Oppdal